The men's marathon T12 event at the 2020 Summer Paralympics in Tokyo, took place on 5 September 2021.

Records
Prior to the competition, the existing records were as follows:

Results
The race took place on 5 September 2021, at 6:50:

References

Men's marathon T12
2021 in men's athletics
Summer Paralympics